Basketball Club Brno, for sponsorship reasons Brno Next Generation, is a Czech professional basketball club based in the city of Brno. The team plays in the Czech National Basketball League – the highest competition in the Czech Republic.

Home games of Brno are played in the Sportovní hala Sokola Brno, which has a capacity of 1,100 people.

The club owned by True Player Group with the idea to "unite the city top two youth clubs to one elite club and push the players to professional level, providing the best coaches, mentoring, nutrition programs, strength programing, rehab, etc."

History 
The team was a European powerhouse from 1945 through the 1960s and mid-1970s. Brno was the most successful basketball club in Czechoslovakia, winning 21 championship titles through the 1970s, and another three titles from 1994 to 1996. Brno lost two FIBA European Champion Cup finals in 1964 and 1968, both times to Spanish champions Real Madrid. The 1974 loss in the FIBA European Cup Winners' Cup final to Crvena zvezda marked the end of a golden era for the club in European competitions.

On January 25 and 26, 1969 Spartak ZJŠ Brno participated in the FIBA Intercontinental Cup at Macon, Georgia, the second time a basketball club from Czechoslovakia participated in the competition after Slavia VŠ Praha had done so in 1967. In the 1969 semifinal, Spartak beat European champions, Real Madrid but lost the final 71–84 to the Akron Goodyear Wingfoots, a basketball team of workers at the Goodyear Tire Company in Akron, Ohio.

Since 2022 Brno team participates also in the newly founded international league European North Basketball League. In the debut season Brno won 4 games out of 5 in the regular season, finishing second in the standings. Later in the Final Four Brno lost to Šiauliai team from Lithuania and won the bronze medal.

Current roster

Depth chart

Sponsorship names

Partly due to sponsorship reasons, the club has known several names:

Honours
Total titles: 24

Domestic 
Czechoslovak League
 Winners (21): 1945–46, 1947, 1947–48, 1948*, 1948–49, 1949–50, 1950–51, 1951*, 1957–58, 1961–62, 1962–63, 1963–64, 1966–67, 1967–68, 1975–76, 1976–77, 1977–78, 1985–86, 1986–87, 1987–88, 1989–90
Czech League
 Winners (3): 1993–94, 1994–95, 1995–96

European 
EuroLeague
 Runners-up (2): 1963–64, 1967–68 
FIBA Saporta Cup
 Runners-up (1): 1973–74

Worldwide 
FIBA Intercontinental Cup
 Runners-up (1): 1969

International record

The road to the great European journeys 

1963–64 FIBA European Champions Cup

1967–68 FIBA European Champions Cup
{| class="wikitable" style="text-align: left; font-size:95%"
|- bgcolor="#ccccff"
! Round
! Team
!   Home   
!   Away    
|-
|2nd round
| Altınordu
|align="center"|102–69
|align="center"|65–61
|-
|rowspan=3|Quarter-finals
| Real Madrid
|align="center"|113–97
|align="center"|78–85
|-
| Racing Bell Mechelen
|align="center"|76–67
|align="center"|79–80
|-
| Maccabi Tel Aviv
|align="center"|105–76
|align="center"|88–77
|-
|Semi-finals
| Simmenthal Milano
|align="center"|103–86
|align="center"|63–64
|-
|Final
| Real Madrid
|colspan=2 align="center"|95–98
|}1973–74 FIBA European Cup Winners' Cup'''

Notable players 

  Jan Bobrovský (1963–1972 & 1973–1978)
  Zdeněk Bobrovský (1950–1951 & 1954–1968)
  Kamil Brabenec (1972–1982 & 1983–1988)
  Vlastimil Havlík (1975–1983 & 1984–1988)
  Zdeněk Konečný (1955–1967)
  František Konvička (1957–1969 & 1971–1973)
  Leoš Krejčí (1983–1988, 1989–1990 & 1994–1998)
  Robert Mifka (1966–1968)
  Petr Novický (1966–1974)
  Jiří Okáč (1980–1984, 1986–1990 & 2003–2004)
  Vojtěch Petr (1972–1980)
  Vladimír Pištělák (1958–1969 & 1971–1973)
  Jiří "Áda" Pospíšil (1968–1974)
  Jaroslav Tetiva (1951–1953)

References

External links 
 Eurobasket.com BC Brno Page

Sport in Brno
Basketball teams established in 1926
Basketball teams in the Czech Republic
Basketball in Czechoslovakia